Streptomyces siamensis is a bacterium species from the genus of Streptomyces which has been isolated from soil from Thailand.

See also 
 List of Streptomyces species

References 

 

siamensis
Bacteria described in 2016